Poyya  is a village in Thrissur district in the state of Kerala, India. The panchayath office is situated in Pooppathy. The distance from Poyya to Kodungallur is only 7 km and Poyya to Mala is 5 km. A part of Thrissur district ends at Poyya.

Demographics

 India census, Poyya had a population of 10478 with 5003 males and 5475 females.

Transport
Major roads in Poyya:
 Kodungallur - Kodakara road
 Kodungallur - Airport road
 North Paravur - Mala road

Education
Schools in Poyya:
 A.K.M.H.S.S Poyya
 St. Mary's LP School
 AIM Law College Poyya
 St Thomas U P School poyya

Hospital
 Government Hospital, Poyya

Religious
Temples in Poyya:
 Karthikakkavu Bhagavathy Temple
 Narasimhaswamy Temple
 Vishnupuram SreeMahavishnuTemple
 Sree Bhairava Temple

Churches in Poyya:
 St. Sebastian's Church
 St. Ephraim's Church
 Christ The King Church
 Little flower Church

References

Villages in Thrissur district